Brilliant Corners is a studio album by American jazz musician Thelonious Monk. It was his third album for Riverside Records, and the first, for this label, to include his own compositions. The complex title track required over a dozen takes in the studio.

Recording 
The album was recorded in three sessions in late 1956 with two different quintets. "Ba-lue Bolivar Ba-lues-Are" and "Pannonica", on which Monk played the celeste, were recorded on October 9 with saxophonists Ernie Henry and Sonny Rollins, bassist Oscar Pettiford, and drummer Max Roach. The former composition was titled as a phonetic rendering of Monk's exaggerated pronunciation of "Blue Bolivar Blues", which referred to the Bolivar Hotel where Pannonica de Koenigswarter resided; Monk had met her during his first trip to Europe in 1954.

On October 15, Monk attempted to record the title track with the same band during a four-hour session. The complexity of the title track became a challenge for Monk's sidemen, who attempted twenty-five takes, and led to tension between him and Henry, who nearly broke down mentally, and Pettiford, who exchanged harsh words with Monk during the session. Monk tried to make it easier on Henry by not playing during his alto solo. During one of the takes, producer Orrin Keepnews and others in the control room could not hear Pettiford's playing and checked his bass microphone for a malfunction, but ultimately realized that he was pantomiming his playing. Without a completed single take, Keepnews ultimately pieced together the album version from multiple takes.

On December 7, "Bemsha Swing" was recorded with Paul Chambers on bass and trumpeter Clark Terry, who replaced Henry, and Monk recorded a solo piano version of "I Surrender, Dear".

Composition 
The title track has an unconventional song structure that deviates from both standard song form and blues structures, as well as from Monk's African-American music roots. Its ternary form employs an eight-bar A section, followed by a seven-bar B section, and a modified seven-bar A section, and features a double-time theme in each second chorus and complex rhythmic accents.

"Bemsha Swing" was the only composition on the album that Monk had recorded in a previous version.

Critical reception 

According to Down Beat magazine, Brilliant Corners was the most critically acclaimed album of 1957. Nat Hentoff, the magazine's editor, gave it five stars in a contemporary review and called it "Riverside's most important modern jazz LP to date." Jazz writer David H. Rosenthal later called it a "classic" hard bop session. Music critic Robert Christgau said that, along with his 1958 live album Misterioso, Brilliant Corners represents Monk's artistic peak. In his five-star review of the album, Allmusic's Lindsay Planer wrote that it "may well be considered the alpha and omega of post-World War II American jazz. No serious jazz collection should be without it." Awarding a maximum four-star rating, The Penguin Guide to Jazz Recordings included the album in its suggested “core collection” of essential recordings.

In 2003, Brilliant Corners was one of fifty recordings chosen that year by the Library of Congress to be added to the National Recording Registry. It has also been included in the reference book 1001 Albums You Must Hear Before You Die, with reviewer Andrew Gilbert saying it "marked Monk's return as composer of the first order." Because of its historical significance the album was inducted into the Grammy Hall of Fame in 1999.

Track listing 
All tracks written by Thelonious Monk except where noted

Side One
 "Brilliant Corners" - 7:42
 "Ba-Lue Bolivar Ba-Lues-Are" - 13:24

Side Two
 "Pannonica" - 8:50
 "I Surrender, Dear" (Harry Barris) - 5:25
 "Bemsha Swing" (Thelonious Monk, Denzil Best) - 7:42

Personnel 
Musicians
 Thelonious Monk – piano; piano and celeste on "Pannonica", solo piano on I Surrender Dear
 Ernie Henry – alto saxophone on "Brilliant Corners", "Ba-lue Bolivar Ba-lues-are" and in ensemble on "Pannonica"
 Sonny Rollins – tenor saxophone (except "I Surrender Dear")
 Oscar Pettiford – double bass on "Brilliant Corners", "Ba-lue Bolivar Ba-lues-are" and "Pannonica"
 Max Roach – drums (except "I Surrender Dear"); timpani on "Bemsha Swing"
 Clark Terry – trumpet on "Bemsha Swing"
 Paul Chambers – double bass on "Bemsha Swing"

Production
  Orrin Keepnews – producer
  Jack Higgins – engineer
  Joe Tarantino – mastering

References

Bibliography

Further reading

External links 
 

1957 albums
Thelonious Monk albums
Sonny Rollins albums
United States National Recording Registry recordings
Riverside Records albums
Albums produced by Orrin Keepnews
Grammy Hall of Fame Award recipients
Original Jazz Classics albums
United States National Recording Registry albums